The Houston Cougars women's basketball team represents the University of Houston in NCAA Division I women's basketball.  Coached by Ronald Hughey, the team plays their home games at Fertitta Center on-campus at the University of Houston.

Notable former players

Year by year results
Conference tournament winners noted with # Source

|-style="background: #ffffdd;"
| colspan="8" align="center" | Southwest Conference

|-style="background: #ffffdd;"
| colspan="8" align="center" | Conference USA

|-style="background: #ffffdd;"
| colspan="8" align="center" | American Athletic Conference

NCAA tournament results

References

External links